KRYE (94.7 FM) is a radio station licensed to Beulah, Colorado, United States. The station is owned by Greeley Broadcasting Corporation.

History
The station was assigned the KAUY call letters on May 16, 1997. On August 21, 1998, the station changed its call sign to KKIK and on October 22, 2001, to KFVR-FM.

On January 19, 2012, KFVR-FM changed its format from regional Mexican to classic rock.

On September 1, 2013, KFVR-FM changed its format from classic rock to oldies.

On November 3, 2014, after KIQN was bought by EMF Broadcasting and ended its country format, KFVR-FM adopted its old format as "KIQ'N Country". The oldies format moved to KWRP 690 AM.

On September 1, 2015, KFVR-FM changed their format to classic hip hop, branded as "The Beat", while its previous "KIQ'N Country" format moved to KJQY 103.3 FM Colorado City.

KRYE-FM later changed to a Regional Mexican format.

The station changed its call sign to KRYE on May 10, 2019.

Former logo

References

External links

RYE
Radio stations established in 2001
2001 establishments in Colorado